Vibeke Engelstad (née Smidt; 27 April 1919 – 8 July 2004) was a Norwegian physician and specialist in psychiatry.

Engelstad was born in Sandefjord to bishop Johannes Smidt and Jofrid Grimstvedt. She was a sister of literary historian Kristian Smidt, and was married to journalist and writer Carl Fredrik Engelstad.

Her books include Sett og hørt som lege i Afrika from 1965, Menneskeriket from 1973, and Mening og Mysterium. Streif i religionspsykologi from 1995.

References

1919 births
2004 deaths
People from Sandefjord
Norwegian psychiatrists
Norwegian women psychiatrists